The Catalina 34 is an American sailboat designed by Frank V. Butler and first built in 1985. The design is out of production.

Production
The boat was built by Catalina Yachts in the United States, which completed 1,438 examples.

Design

The Catalina 34 is a recreational keelboat, built predominantly of fiberglass, with wood trim. It has a masthead sloop rig, an internally-mounted spade-type rudder and a fixed keel.

Variants
Catalina 34 Mk I
Original model introduced in 1985. It displaces  and carries  of ballast. The boat has a PHRF racing average handicap of 138 with a high of 153 and low of 114. The last Mk I models produced resembled the Mk II in configuration.
Catalina 34 SD
It displaces . The boat has a PHRF racing average handicap of 150 with a high of 156 and low of 141.
Catalina 34 TM
It displaces . The boat has a PHRF racing average handicap of 144 with a high of 165 and low of 135.
Catalina 34 WK
It displaces . The boat has a PHRF racing average handicap of 153 with a high of 159 and low of 150.
Catalina 34 TM WK
It displaces . The boat has a PHRF racing average handicap of 150 with a high of 162 and low of 147.
Catalina 34 Mk II
Redesigned model introduced in 1996, with a wider aft deck, a deck stepped mast with compression post and many small refinements. The Mark II is identical at the waterline to permit the boats to be raced against the earlier boats in a one design class. It displaces  and carries  of ballast. The Mk II has a PHRF racing average handicap of 153 with a high of 171 and low of 147.

See also

List of sailing boat types

Similar sailboats
Beneteau 331
Beneteau First Class 10
C&C 34
C&C 34/36
Coast 34
Columbia 34
Columbia 34 Mark II
Creekmore 34
Crown 34
CS 34
Express 34
Hunter 34
San Juan 34
Sea Sprite 34
Sun Odyssey 349
Tartan 34 C
Tartan 34-2
Viking 34

References

External links

Keelboats
1980s sailboat type designs
Sailing yachts 
Sailboat types built by Catalina Yachts
Sailboat type designs by Frank Butler